Yingzhou is a town in Lingshui Li Autonomous County, Hainan, China.

Township-level divisions of Hainan